Konradas Kaveckas (November 2, 1905 in Tirkšliai, Mažeikiai County - November 8, 1996 in Vilnius) was a Lithuanian organist and choral conductor. Kaveckas established himself among the most prominent Lithuanian composers prior to German occcupation. Under Stalin's rule Kaveckas composed secular choral music publicly, but in secret also religious music.

Recordings
Susitikt Tave Norėčiau Vėlei (LP)	Мелодия	С10-08827-8	1977

References
 

1905 births
1996 deaths

lt:Konradas Kaveckas